The Mississippi Religious Freedom Restoration Act is a 2014 act that states that "government should not substantially burden religious exercise without compelling justification. The act protects religious people from legal repercussions if they verbally condemn the lifestyle or actions of LGBT persons. Additionally, the bill expands the definition of an individual to include businesses, and so if a business owner thinks their religious beliefs would be violated by delivering service to an LGBT person, the Act allows them to deny them service, a move that some commentators have called "anti-gay segregation".

Legislative history
On April 1, 2014, Mississippi House of Representatives passed, with 79 ayes, and 43 nays, Senate Bill 2681. On the same day, 2014, the Mississippi Senate passed, with a 37 ayes, 14 nays, and 1 absent or not voting, SB 2681. On April 3, 2014, Governor Phil Bryant signed the bill and it went into effect on July 1, 2014.

Response

The Human Rights Campaign opposed SB 2681. It has also been criticized on grounds of using religious opinion to give cover to racial discrimination.

See also
LGBT rights in Mississippi
State Religious Freedom Restoration Acts

References

2014 in American law
2014 in LGBT history
2014 in Mississippi
Discrimination against LGBT people in the United States
Freedom of religion in the United States
LGBT in Mississippi
Mississippi law
Politics of Mississippi